James Roberts MBE (born 11 May 1986 in Mons, Belgium) is a wheelchair basketball player and Paralympic athlete based in Prestatyn, Denbighshire, Wales. Roberts was born with a disability called femoral dysplasia. He started out in his sporting career as a swimmer, and progressed on to other Paralympic sports, such as rowing and sitting volleyball.
He competed for Great Britain at the 2008 Beijing Paralympics, finishing fifth in the trunk and arm classification in adaptive rowing. He also competed for Great Britain at the 2012 Summer Paralympics in London, finishing 8th in the sitting volleyball. More recently he has begun playing wheelchair basketball for local side Rhyl Raptors.

Early years and education
Roberts was born on 11 May 1986 in Mons, Belgium. He attended the SHAPE American High School and graduated in 2005. After taking up his place at Swansea University to pursue a Bachelor of Science in sport and exercise science, he graduated with a second-class honours degree in summer 2010. In September 2011 Roberts embarked on postgraduate studies in sociology of sport and exercise at the University of Chester, subsequently graduating with a Postgraduate Certificate.

Tokyo Paralympics
In 2021, Roberts was part of the Great Britain team that took wheelchair rugby gold at the 2020 Tokyo Paralympics. He was subsequently appointed Member of the Order of the British Empire (MBE) in the 2022 New Year Honours for services to wheelchair rugby.

References 

Living people
Paralympic athletes of Great Britain
1986 births
Rowers at the 2008 Summer Paralympics
Volleyball players at the 2012 Summer Paralympics
Paralympic wheelchair basketball players of Great Britain
British sitting volleyball players
Men's sitting volleyball players
Alumni of Swansea University
Alumni of the University of Chester
People from Prestatyn
Sportspeople from Denbighshire
Welsh men's basketball players
Paralympic wheelchair rugby players of Great Britain
Wheelchair rugby players at the 2012 Summer Paralympics
Medalists at the 2020 Summer Paralympics
Paralympic gold medalists for Great Britain
Wheelchair rugby players at the 2020 Summer Paralympics
Paralympic medalists in wheelchair rugby
Members of the Order of the British Empire
Sportspeople from Mons